Eucalyptus histophylla is a species of mallee or small tree that is endemic to southern Western Australia. It has smooth bark, often with ribbons of shed bark, linear to narrow lance-shaped adult leaves, flower buds arranged in groups in leaf axils, white flowers and cylindrical to barrel-shaped or conical fruit.

Description
It has smooth, greyish or pale brownish bark, usually with hanging ribbons of shed bark. Flowering occurs between December and January and the flowers are pale yellow.

Taxonomy and naming
Eucalyptus histophylla was first formally described in 1991 by Ian Brooker and Stephen Hopper from a specimen collected by Hopper between Balladonia and Norseman. The description was published in the journal Nuytsia and the specific epithet is from the Greek histos, 'upright', and phyllon, 'leaf', referring to the erect leaves.

Distribution and habitat
This eucalypt grows in sandy-loam soils among granite outcrops or in laterite, between the Fraser Range and Balladonia, sometimes in areas further south, in the Avon Wheatbelt, Coolgardie, Mallee and Nullarbor Plain biogeographic regions.

Conservation status
Eucalyptus histophylla is classified as "Priority Three" by the Western Australian Government Department of Parks and Wildlife meaning that it is poorly known and known from only a few locations but is not under imminent threat.

See also
List of Eucalyptus species

References

Eucalypts of Western Australia
histophylla
Myrtales of Australia
Plants described in 1991
Taxa named by Ian Brooker
Taxa named by Stephen Hopper